Cupania vernalis is a plant species in the genus Cupania.

External links

vernalis